Slater Rocks is a cluster of rock outcrops or low rock hills 4 nautical miles (7 km) north of Leister Peak in the Kohler Range, Marie Byrd Land. Mapped by United States Geological Survey (USGS) from ground surveys and U.S. Navy air photos, 1959–71. Named by Advisory Committee on Antarctic Names (US-ACAN) for Robert T. Slater, EO2, U.S. Navy, Equipment Operator at the South Pole Station, 1974.

Rock formations of Marie Byrd Land